Luis Javier Alanís Ávalos (born July 17, 1990) is a Mexican football midfielder who currently plays for Cruz Azul in the Primera División de México.

References

Living people
1990 births
Footballers from Mexico City
Cruz Azul footballers
Association football midfielders
Mexican footballers